Margie is a 1940 American comedy film directed by Otis Garrett and Paul Gerard Smith and written by Erna Lazarus, Scott Darling and Paul Gerard Smith. The film stars Tom Brown, Nan Grey, Mischa Auer, Joy Hodges, Edgar Kennedy, Allen Jenkins, Eddie Quillan and Wally Vernon. The film was released on December 6, 1940, by Universal Pictures.

Plot

Cast        
Tom Brown as Bret
Nan Grey as Margie
Mischa Auer as Gomez
Joy Hodges as Ruth
Edgar Kennedy as Chauncey
Allen Jenkins as Kenneth
Eddie Quillan as Joe
Wally Vernon as Al
Richard Lane as Mr. Dixon
Emmett Vogan as Mr. White
Pauline Haddon as Miss Walter
David Oliver as Waiter
Frank Faylen as Mr. Leffingwell
John Sheehan as Mr. Cladwell
Effie Laird as Mrs. Horstwalder 
Horace McMahon as Detective
Ralph Peters as Detective
Aileen Carlyle as Mrs. Gypsum-Weed
Edward McWade as Pinwinkle
Gene Collins as Ethridge

References

External links
 

1940 films
American comedy films
1940 comedy films
Universal Pictures films
American black-and-white films
Films directed by Otis Garrett
1940s English-language films
1940s American films